Fool's Gold, or pyrite, is a mineral with a superficial resemblance to gold.

Fool's Gold may also refer to:

Film and television 
 Fool's Gold (1919 film), a silent drama film
 Fool's Gold (1947 film), a Hopalong Cassidy film
 Fool's Gold (1999 film), a film featuring Camryn Manheim
 Fool's Gold (2005 film), a comedy starring James Franco
 Fool's Gold (2006 film), a short film starring Holly Dignard
 Fool's Gold (2008 film), a romantic comedy/adventure starring Kate Hudson and Matthew McConaughey
 Fool's Gold (TV series), a reality-TV show on Discovery Channel Canada (airs in the U.S. on Animal Planet)
 "Fool's Gold" (American Dragon: Jake Long), an episode of American Dragon: Jake Long
 "Fool's Gold" (Ben 10: Alien Force), an episode of Ben 10: Alien Force
 "Fool's Gold" (Goof Troop), an episode of Goof Troop

Literature 
 Fool's Gold (comics), an OEL manga published by Tokyopop
 Fool's Gold, a 1958 novel by Dolores Hitchens
 Fool's Gold, a 1993 novel by Zilpha Keatley Snyder
 "Fool's Gold", a short story by Elizabeth Moon in the 1999 anthology Chicks 'n Chained Males
 Fool's Gold, a 2002–2005 fantasy trilogy by Jude Fisher
 "Fool's Gold", a series of romance novels by Susan Mallery
 Fool's Gold: How Unrestrained Greed Corrupted a Dream, Shattered Global Markets and Unleashed a Catastrophe, a non-fiction book by Gillian Tett

Music 
 Fool's Gold (band), a Los Angeles, California-based band
 Fool's Gold Records, an American record label

Albums 
 Fool's Gold (Fool's Gold album), 2009
 Fool's Gold (Jill Barber album), 2014
 Fool's Gold, by Big B, 2013

Songs 
 "Fool's Gold" (Blackmore's Night song), 1999
 "Fool's Gold" (Aaron Carter song), 2016
 "Fool's Gold" (Jack River song), 2017
 "Fool's Gold" (Lee Greenwood song), 1984
 "Fool's Gold" (One Direction song), 2014
 "Fools Gold"/"What the World Is Waiting For", a 1989 double A-side single by The Stone Roses
 "Fools Gold", by Fitz and The Tantrums from More Than Just a Dream
 "Fool's Gold", by Passenger from Young as the Morning, Old as the Sea
 "Fool's Gold", by Petra from Back to the Street
 "Fools Gold", by Poco from Crazy Eyes
 "Fool's Gold", by Procol Harum from Procol's Ninth
 "Fools Gold", by Thin Lizzy from Johnny the Fox
 "Fools Gold", by Zion I from Mind Over Matter

See also
 Fool's Gold Loaf, a sandwich popularized by Elvis Presley